Everyday People is a cartoon written and drawn by Cathy Thorne. The cartoon generally uses a single captioned panel featuring a female protagonist. The series debuted in 1999, and has been in continuous production ever since, publishing a new cartoon on a weekly schedule. There are currently over 600 different cartoons on the website covering topics such as motherhood, relationships, health, beauty and well-being.

Books
 Cartoons About Women (and the people who love and annoy them), 2009 
 Cookie In The Moment, 2012

Other media

Newspaper
Individual cartoons have been syndicated in various international papers, including:
Toronto Star (Ontario, Canada)
Sunday Herald Sun (Melbourne, Australia)
Richmond Times-Dispatch (Virginia, USA)
The Press (Christchurch, New Zealand)
Ventura County Star (California, USA)
Sunday Telegraph (Sydney, Australia)
Kansas City Star (Kansas, USA)

Magazines
Individual cartoons have appeared in various magazines, including:
Good Housekeeping
More Magazine
Reader's Digest

Websites
Individual cartoons have appeared on various websites, including:
www.massmoms.com
www.savvymom.ca

Newsletters
 Johnson and Johnson's babycenter.com's Pregnancy newsletter
Johnson and Johnson's babycenter.com's BabyStages newsletter

Awards
Cathy Thorne's Everyday People blog placed 2nd in the Comics category of the 2010 Canadian Weblog Awards.
In 2010, Reader's Digest selected Cathy Thorne as one of five talented cartoonists from across Canada to watch."

References

Canadian comic strips